Allococalodes cornutus is a species of jumping spider (family Salticidae) endemic to New Guinea.

References

Salticidae
Arthropods of New Guinea
Spiders of Oceania
Spiders described in 1982
Endemic fauna of New Guinea